Edge of Reality is an American video game company.

Edge of Reality may also refer to:

 "Edge of Reality" (Elvis Presley song), a single released in 1968
 Edge of Reality, a 2012 EP by the Dead Rabbitts
 Doctor Who: The Edge of Reality, a 2020 video game published by Maze Theory